Barons' War may refer to:
First Barons' War (1215–1217) in England during the reign of John 
Second Barons' War (1264–1267) in England during the reign of Henry III